= The Essence (band) =

Dutch band

- Origin: Rotterdam, Netherlands
- Genres: Alternative rock; gothic rock; dark wave; synth-pop
- Years active: 1984 — present
- Labels: Midnight Music; CRN International Records; Cherry Red Records
- Members: Hans Diener; Mark Tan; George Tan
- Past members: Jerry Geertsma; Olaf Willemsen; Akki; Jos

The Essence are a Dutch gothic rock and dark wave band formed in Rotterdam in 1984. The band was founded by singer and guitarist Hans Diener, bassist Jeroen "Jerry" Geertsma and drummer Olaf Willemsen. Their music incorporates elements of new wave and post-punk, and has frequently been compared to the sound of the English rock band The Cure.

The band released their debut studio album, Purity, through Midnight Music in 1985. Their second album, A Monument of Trust (1987), produced the single "A Mirage", which became a top-ten hit in Spain. The success of the song was followed by extensive touring throughout Europe. The Essence subsequently released Ecstasy (1988), Nothing Lasts Forever (1991) and Glow (1995).

Although primarily associated with the European gothic rock and new wave scenes of the 1980s and 1990s, The Essence have continued performing and releasing music in subsequent decades.

== History ==
The Essence were formed in 1984 and began as a school band. After a period of touring, they signed with the British independent label Midnight Music and released their debut album, ''Purity'', in 1985. The album was accompanied by the singles "Endless Lakes" and "The Cat", with the latter receiving attention in the Netherlands and Germany.

Their second album, ''A Monument of Trust'', was released in 1987. Its single "A Mirage" became one of the band's best-known songs and reached the top ten in Spain. The band subsequently toured throughout Europe, developing audiences in countries including France, Germany, Spain, Switzerland and the United Kingdom.

The band's third album, ''Ecstasy'', followed in 1988. During this period, The Essence continued touring and released songs including "Only for You" and "Like Christ". Their fourth studio album, the concept album ''Nothing Lasts Forever'', was released in 1991.

In 1994, Cherry Red Records released the compilation ''Dancing in the Rain'', which was accompanied by a new version of "A Mirage". A Spanish-language version, "Un Espejismo", was also recorded. The Essence later signed with CNR International and released ''Glow'', their fifth studio album, in 1996.

The band continued to perform in Europe in subsequent years, although its activities became less frequent. In 2015, ''Glow'' was reissued in an expanded edition titled ''Afterglow''.

== Discography ==
=== Albums ===
- 1985: Purity
- 1987: A Monument of Trust
- 1988: Ecstasy
- 1991: Nothing Lasts Forever
- 1994: Dancing in the Rain (Best Of)
- 1996: Ecstasy / Nothing Lasts Forever
- 1996: Glow
- 2015: Afterglow

=== Singles ===
- 1985: Endless Lakes
- 1985: The Cat (Remix)
- 1987: A Mirage
- 1990: Only for You
- 1990: Like Christ
- 1991: Out of Grace
- 1994: A Mirage '94 - The Mixes
- 1996: Gone
- 1996: Taking on the World
